Herbivores are animals that eat plants. Herbivory is a form of consumption in which a heterotrophic organism consumes other organisms, principally autotrophs such as plants, algae and photosynthesizing bacteria.  More generally, organisms that feed on autotrophs in general are known as 1st level consumers.

Invertebrates

Insects 
Herbivory is of extreme ecological importance and prevalence among insects. Perhaps one third (or 500,000) of all described species are herbivores.
 Larval mayflies are generally herbivorous; adults have short lifespans and do not eat at all.
 Most members of the order Orthoptera; for instance, most grasshoppers and katydids are herbivores
 Butterflies
 Many beetles of the Scarabaeoidea, including many scarabs, like the goliath and rhinoceros beetles (e.g., the hercules beetle), and all of the stag beetles
 The jewel beetles (family Buprestidae)
 Certain ladybugs (family Coccinellidae): The subfamily Epilachninae, comprising 1/6 of all ladybug species, is entirely herbivorous, including members such as the Mexican bean beetle and the bryony ladybird.
 The leaf beetles (family Chrysomelidae)
 The weevils (family Curculionidae)
 Almost all adult bees (clade Anthophila), including mason bees, honeybees, bumblebees, sweat bees, and carpenter bees
 All true bugs (order Hemiptera) outside of Heteroptera are herbivores, including cicadas, leafhoppers, treehoppers, planthoppers, aphids, scale insects, and whiteflies
 Most Heteropterans are also herbivorous, including most of the leaf-footed bugs, seed bugs and their relatives, plant bugs, and shield, stink, and burrowing bugs and their relatives

Other invertebrates
 Most terrestrial isopods (woodlice) are detritivores of plant matter
 Millipedes, with scarce exceptions, are also detritivores of plant matter
 Bagheera kiplingi, a jumping spider
 Garden snails and slugs
 Earthworms are detritivores

Fish
Herbivorous fish play a key role in maintaining healthy ecosystems, especially in tropical reefs, where they promote a balance between corals and macroalgae. Herbivorous fish include:
Acanthurus lineatus or lined surgeonfish (also known as blue-banded surgeonfish, blue-lined surgeonfish, clown surgeonfish, pajama tang, striped surgeonfish, and zebra surgeonfish)
Acanthurus nigrofuscus, known as the lavender tang, brown tang, or spot-cheeked surgeonfish 
Zebrasoma scopas, known as the brown tang, two-tone tang, scopas tang or brush-tail tang. 
 The unicornfishes (Nasinae) genus is primarily herbivorous. 
 Most of the nearly 100 species of the parrotfish family are herbivores.
 Grass carp, so named for its diet of aquatic plants.
 The various genera of pacu are mostly herbivorous.
 The majority of Loricariidae, including most pleco and Otocinclus species, are predominantly or exclusively herbivorous.

Amphibians
Unusually for tetrapods, herbivory is rare among extant adult lissamphibians. There are, however, many larval and a few adult amphibians which take significant plant matter:
 At least two species of siren (and possibly the entire family) will consume algae, though they are still primarily carnivorous or omnivorous
 The Indian green frog is mostly herbivorous
 Xenohyla truncata, the Izecksohn's Brazilian treefrog, is significantly frugivorous
 The majority of frog tadpoles are primarily herbivorous

Reptiles

Squamates (lizards, snakes, and worm lizards)
All snakes and the majority of non-snake Squamates (lizards) are carnivorous. However, some degree of herbivory is relatively common among lizards. Perhaps 12% of lizards have diets which are >10% herbivorous. Dedicated herbivory, with plants comprising >90% of the diet, occurs in perhaps ~1% of lizards, though estimates vary.
 Iguanas (family Iguanidae) are overwhelmingly herbivores. Members such as the rhinoceros iguana, marine iguana, green iguana, Lesser Antillean iguana, chuckwallas, desert iguana, and Galápagos land iguana are virtually exclusively herbivorous.
 Members of the family Liolaemidae are herbivores.
 The Panay, Northern Sierra Madre forest, and Gray's monitor lizards are the only three species of herbivorous Varanid.
 Species of the Agamid genus Uromastyx, the spiny-tailed lizards, are herbivores.
 Certain skinks; the Solomon Islands skink is exclusively herbivorous. King's skink is also primarily a herbivore. The extinct Cape Verde giant skink was herbivorous.

Chelonians (turtles/tortoises)
Tortoises, comprising the family Testudinidae, are all almost exclusively herbivorous
Adult green sea turtles are herbivorous, uniquely among sea turtles

Dinosaurs
Sauropods
Ornithischians
Marginocephalia
Ceratopsians
Pachycephalosaurs
Thyreophora
Stegosaurs
Ankylosaurs
Ornithopods
Hadrosaurs
Theropods
Therizinosaurs
 Birds
 Waterfowl: The majority of ducks, geese, swans, and their relatives are herbivores. The main exceptions are the sea ducks.
 Game birds: Turkeys, peafowl, pheasants, ptarmigans, quails, junglefowl, and their relatives are largely or exclusively herbivorous, though several taxa are also quite omnivorous
 Hoatzin
 Parrots

Mammals
Mammals (formally Mammalia) are a class of vertebrate, air-breathing animals whose females are characterized by the possession of mammary glands while both males and females are characterized by hair and/or fur, three middle ear bones used in hearing, and a neocortex region in the brain. Herbivorous mammals include:
Ungulata
Odd-toed ungulates, including horses, asses, and zebras, rhinoceroses, and tapirs. Like many mammalian herbivores, they are hindgut fermenters.
Even-toed ungulates such as camels, pigs, hippopotamuses, deer, bovids, and giraffes. Many are ruminants, animals with compartmentalized stomachs for processing plant material.
Paenungulata (Proboscidea, Sirenia, Hyracoidea)
Castorimorpha (kangaroo rat, gopher, beaver)
Lagomorpha (Leporidae, Ochotonidae)
Sloths
Marsupialia
Macropodidae (kangaroo, wallaby)
Vombatiformes (wombats, koala)

See also 
 Mesocarnivore
 Hypercarnivore
 Herbivore
 Omnivore
 Piscivore
 Veganism
 Vegetarianism

References 

Herbivores
Herbivorous animals